Ulysse Pastre (19 January 1864 – 29 January 1930) was a French politician.

Pastre was born in Gallargues-le-Montueux.  At first he joined the French Workers' Party (POF), which in 1902 merged into the Socialist Party of France (PSdF), which in turn merged into the French Section of the Workers' International (SFIO) in 1905. Pastre was a member of the Chamber of Deputies from 1898 to 1910.

References

1864 births
1930 deaths
People from Gard
Politicians from Occitania (administrative region)
French Workers' Party politicians
Socialist Party of France (1902) politicians
French Section of the Workers' International politicians
Members of the 7th Chamber of Deputies of the French Third Republic
Members of the 8th Chamber of Deputies of the French Third Republic
Members of the 9th Chamber of Deputies of the French Third Republic